Syncopacma ochrofasciella is a moth of the family Gelechiidae. It was described by Toll in 1936. It is found in the Russian Far East, China (Jilin) and Europe, where it has been recorded from Germany, Poland, Austria, the Czech Republic, Slovakia, Hungary, Romania, Latvia, Ukraine and Russia.

The wingspan is about 11.5 mm.

References

Moths described in 1936
Syncopacma